Gnaphosa badia is a ground spider species found from Europe to Azerbaijan.

See also 
 List of Gnaphosidae species

References

External links 

Gnaphosidae
Spiders of Europe
Spiders of Asia
Fauna of Azerbaijan
Spiders described in 1866